The 1946 William & Mary Indians football team was an American football team that represented the College of William & Mary as a member of the Southern Conference (SoCon) during the 1946 college football season. In their third season under head coach Rube McCray, the Indians compiled an 8–2 record (7–1 againt SoCon opponents), finished in second place in the SoCon, and outscored all opponents by a total of 347 to 71.

William & Mary ranked third nationally among major colleges in scoring offense with 34.7 point per game. They also ranked 11th nationally in total offense with an average of 338.3 yards per game. On defense, the team ranked ninth in scoring defense (7.1 point per game), and 15th in total defense.

Guard Knox Ramsey, younger brother of Buster Ramsey, was selected by both the Associated Press (AP) and United Press (UP) as a first-team player on the 1946 All-Southern Conference football team. Ramsey also received third-team honors from the AP on the 1946 All-America college football team. He was praised for his ability to get out of the line fast to lead interference and for his exceptional downfield blocking.

Back Jack Cloud led the team, and ranked 23rd nationally, in scoring with 66 points on 11 touchdowns. Cloud also received first-team honors from the AP and UP on the 1946 All-Southern Conference team. Others receiving all-conference honors were back Tommy Korczowski (AP-3, UP-2), end Robert Steckroth (AP-2, UP-3), tackle Ralph Sazio (AP-2), and center Tommy Thompson (AP-3).

Schedule

NFL Draft selections

References 

William and Mary
William & Mary Tribe football seasons
William